Pichaya Kurattanasiri is a Thai Paralympic track and field athlete who competes in T52 sprint events.

Career 
He claimed a bronze medal in the men's 400 m T52 event at the 2015 IPC Athletics World Championships which was also eventually his first medal at the IPC Athletics World Championships.

He made his debut appearance at the Paralympics representing Thailand at the 2016 Summer Paralympics and competed in the men's 100m T52, men's 400m T52 and men's 1500m T52 events. He claimed bronze medal in the 1500m T52 event which was his first Paralympic medal.

References 

Living people
Pichaya Kurattanasiri
Pichaya Kurattanasiri
Medalists at the 2016 Summer Paralympics
Pichaya Kurattanasiri
Place of birth missing (living people)
Track and field athletes with disabilities
Paralympic medalists in athletics (track and field)
Athletes (track and field) at the 2016 Summer Paralympics
1988 births
Pichaya Kurattanasiri